Valeriana buxifolia is a species of plant in the family Caprifoliaceae. It is endemic to Ecuador. 
Its natural habitats are subtropical or tropical high-altitude shrubland and subtropical or tropical high-altitude grassland.

References

Endemic flora of Ecuador
buxifolia
Vulnerable plants
Taxonomy articles created by Polbot